Pablo Caballero may refer to:
Pablo Caballero (footballer, born 1972), Paraguayan football striker and manager
Pablo Caballero (footballer, born 1986), Argentine football forward for Messina
Pablo Caballero (footballer, born January 1987), Uruguayan football forward
Pablo Caballero (footballer, born November 1987), Uruguayan football midfielder for Sud America

See also
Pablo Cavallero (born 1974), Argentine football goalkeeper